Shirley O. Corriher (born February 23, 1935) is an American biochemist and author of CookWise: The Hows and Whys of Successful Cooking, winner of a James Beard Foundation award, and BakeWise: The Hows and Whys of Successful Baking. CookWise shows how scientific insights can be applied to traditional cooking, while BakeWise applies the same idea to baking. Some compare Corriher's approach to that of Harold McGee (whom Corriher thanks as her "intellectual hero" in the "My Gratitude and Thanks" section of Cookwise) and Alton Brown. She has made a number of appearances as a food consultant on Brown's show Good Eats and has released a DVD, Shirley O. Corriher's Kitchen Secrets Revealed.

Personal life

After graduating from Vanderbilt University in 1959, she and her husband opened a boys' school in Atlanta, Georgia, where she was responsible for cooking three meals a day for 30 boys. By 1970 the school had grown to 140 students. That same year she divorced her husband and left the school; she took up cooking to support herself and her three children.

 Corriher lives with her current husband, Arch, in Atlanta.

Books

See also
 Harold McGee
 Alton Brown

References

External links
Newsletter of the Food, Agriculture, and Nutrition Division of the Special Libraries Association Vol 32 No 1, August 2000, PDF which contains Corriher's Compendium of Ingredient and Cooking Problems - An expanded collection of typical problems in different food areas

1935 births
American women biochemists
American food writers
Women food writers
Women cookbook writers
Living people
Molecular gastronomy
Vanderbilt University alumni
Writers from Atlanta
James Beard Foundation Award winners